The Cape Howe Marine National Park is a protected marine national park situated off eastern Gippsland in the far eastern tip of Victoria, Australia. The  marine park extends from just east of Gabo Island to Cape Howe and the New South Wales border, and is adjacent to Croajingolong National Park.

See also

 Protected areas of Victoria

References

Ramsar sites in Australia
Marine parks in Victoria (Australia)
Coastline of Victoria (Australia)
Protected areas of Bass Strait